Tracy Fullerton (born June 21, 1965) is an American game designer, educator and writer.  She is a Professor in the USC Interactive Media & Games Division of the USC School of Cinematic Arts and Director of the Game Innovation Lab at USC. In 2014 she was named Director of the USC Games Program, an interdisciplinary collaboration between the School of Cinematic Arts and the Viterbi School of Engineering at USC. From 2010 to 2017, she served as Chair of the USC Interactive Media & Games Division.

Biography 

In December 2008, she was installed as the holder of the Electronic Arts Endowed Chair of Interactive Entertainment at USC.  Fullerton is the author of Game Design Workshop, a textbook advocating a playcentric design process.  She was also faculty advisor for the award-winning student games Cloud and flOw, and game designer for The Night Journey, a game/art project in production with media artist Bill Viola, and Participation Nation, a game to teach Constitutional history being produced in collaboration with KCET and Activision. Her project, Walden, a game, was supported by a media arts grant from the National Endowment for the Arts, one of the first video game projects to be awarded such a grant, as well as the National Endowment for the Humanities.

Prior to joining the USC faculty, she was president and founder of the interactive television game developer, Spiderdance, Inc.  Spiderdance's games included NBC's Weakest Link, MTV's webRIOT, The WB's No Boundaries, History Channel's History IQ, Sony Game Show Network's Inquizition and TBS's Cyber Bond.  Before starting Spiderdance, Fullerton was a producer and creative director at the New York design firm R/GA Interactive. While there, she created games and interactive products for clients including Sony, Intel, Microsoft, AdAge, Ticketmaster, Compaq, and Warner Bros. among many others.  Her projects include Sony's Multiplayer Jeopardy! and Multiplayer Wheel of Fortune and MSN's NetWits, an early multiplayer casual game launched in 1996.  Additionally, Fullerton was Creative Director at the interactive film studio Interfilm, where she wrote and co-directed the "cinematic game" Ride for Your Life, which starred Adam West and Matthew Lillard.  She began her career as a designer at Robert Abel's company Synapse, where she worked on the interactive documentary Columbus: Encounter, Discovery and Beyond and other early interactive projects.

Fullerton's work has received numerous industry honors including an Emmy nomination for interactive television, best Family/Board Game from the Academy of Interactive Arts & Sciences, I.D. Magazine's Interactive Design Review, Communication Arts Interactive Design Annual, several New Media Invision awards, iMix Best of Show, the Digital Coast Innovation Award, IBC's Nombre D'Or, Time Magazine's Best of the Web, IndieCade's Festival of Independent Games, The Hollywood Reporters Women in Entertainment Power 100 and Fortune's 10 Powerful Women in Videogames.

Fullerton appeared in Danny Ledonne's documentary Playing Columbine.

She is the cousin to Charlotte Fullerton.

Walden, a game 
In Walden, a game, Tracy Fullerton designed a conceptual, experiential game that simulates the philosophy of living the simplified experience articulated by Transcendental author, Henry David Thoreau. It puts Thoreau's ideas about life into playable form. The game exemplifies Fullerton's design methods, where she encourages designers to find inspiration in ideas and activities that have meaning to them and then see where that leads rather than rely on standard genres and design solutions. She says "Serendipity is a great design strategy, and letting yourself recognize that you've found something great even though you weren't looking for it." Walden, a game was released on Itch.io on July 4, 2017 and subsequently named Game of the Year and Most Significant Impact at the 2017 Games for Change awards.

Writings
 Fullerton, Tracy. Game Design Workshop: A Playcentric Approach to Creating Innovative Games. A K Peters/CRC Press, 2018.

Awards
Game of the Year and Most Significant Impact for Walden, a game at Games for Change 2017
Ambassador Award at Game Developers Choice Awards 2016
Game Changer award at Games for Change 2015
Trailblazer award at IndieCade 2013
Impact award for Reality Ends Here at IndieCade 2012 (game designer)
Sublime Experience award for The Night Journey at IndieCade 2008 (game designer)
Time's Best of the Web

References

External links

TracyFullerton.com - Fullerton's portfolio site
Game Innovation Lab site
USC Games Program site
USC School of Cinematic Arts, Interactive Media & Games Division blog
USC School of Cinematic Arts, Interactive Media & Games Division info site
Game Design Workshop, 3rd Edition site, 3rd Edition site with archived content from old editions.

University of Southern California faculty
American video game designers
American women writers
1965 births
Living people
University of California, Santa Cruz alumni
USC School of Cinematic Arts alumni
Video game researchers
Women video game developers
Women video game designers
Game Developers Conference Ambassador Award recipients
American women academics
21st-century American women